The Dominican Republic is among the one-hundred countries that have submitted films for the Academy Award for Best International Feature Film. The award is handed out annually by the United States Academy of Motion Picture Arts and Sciences to a feature-length motion picture produced outside the United States that contains primarily non-English dialogue. The Dominican Republic has submitted a total of 14 films since their debut in 1983, but they have never yet been nominated.

Submissions
Every year, each country is invited by the Academy of Motion Picture Arts and Sciences to submit its best film for the Academy Award for Best Foreign Language Film. The Foreign Language Film Award Committee oversees the process and reviews all the submitted films. Following this, they vote via secret ballot to determine the five nominees for the award.

The following is a list of the films submitted by the Dominican Republic in the Best Foreign Language Film category at the Academy Awards. All films were produced in Spanish.

Notes

References

Best Foreign Language Film Academy Award submissions by country
Lists of films by country of production
Academy Award
Academy Award for Best Foreign Language Film